Lake Hico is a cooling pond reservoir built on 16th section school land in Jackson, Mississippi, in the 1950s. Its primary purpose is to provide water for the adjacent Rex Brown Plant, which generates electricity with steam. Initially, Lake Hico was open to the public for recreation. The lake was closed to the public in the late 1960s, along with the public swimming pools in Jackson, due to racial prejudices preventing peaceful integration of public swimming holes.

The vast majority of water supply to keep the lake full comes from the pipeline. Lake Hico is near the headwaters of Eubanks Creek, but the creek does not flow through the lake. Hico is an abbreviation for Hinds County, the county in which the lake is situated.

The lake is leased to Entergy, the operator of the Rex Brown Plant, by its owner, the State of Mississippi via its trust for 16th section lands. The lease is overseen by Mississippi's Secretary of State, Entergy pays $258,000 per year for the lease on Lake Hico.

The island divides the warmed water coming out of the plant from the cooler main lake. The island has a concrete boat ramp. The lake was home to the Jackson Yacht Club, until the much larger Ross Barnett Reservoir was built in early 1960s.

Lake Hico is encircled completely by a six-foot chain-link fence with "no trespassing" signs.  The lake is adjoined on the northeast by a city park, however the fence encircling the lake separates the two.

References

Hico
Entergy
Pearl River (Mississippi–Louisiana)
Geography of Hinds County, Mississippi
1950s establishments in Mississippi
Cooling ponds